Aviv Kochavi (born 23 April 1964) was the 22nd Chief of General Staff of the Israel Defense Forces, having taken the oath of office on January 15, 2019. Before becoming Lieutenant General (Rav-Aluf), he was commander of the Gaza Division, commander of the Northern Command, commander of the Paratroopers Brigade and Military Intelligence Director.

Early life and education 

Kochavi was one of three children born to Shaul and Riva Kochavi. His father was a shop owner and his mother was a physical education teacher. His maternal grandfather and some of his brothers immigrated to Israel from Russia before World War II. His paternal grandfather's family lived in Krakow, Poland. His grandfather, Romek-Abraham, immigrated to Israel in the 1920s, and was one of the pioneers of Highway 75 and one of the founders of Kiryat Haim.

He grew up in Kiryat Bialik in the Haifa District, and was a member of the HaMahanot HaOlim Labour Zionist youth movement. He studied at the Habonim school and ORT Kiryat Bialik school.

Kochavi has a bachelor's degree in philosophy from the Hebrew University of Jerusalem, a master's degree in public administration from Harvard University and a master's degree in international relations from Johns Hopkins University.

Military career
Kochavi was drafted into the IDF in 1982. He volunteered as a paratrooper in the Paratroopers Brigade and was placed in the 890th Battalion. He served as a soldier and a squad leader. In 1985 he became an infantry officer after completing Officer Candidate School and returned to the Paratroopers Brigade as a platoon leader. During his career Kochavi led the Brigade's Anti-tank company.

Between 1993 and 1994, he led the 101st "Peten" (Elapidae) paratroop battalion in counter-guerrilla operations in South Lebanon. Afterwards he commanded a Regional Brigade in South Lebanon and a reserve Paratrooper Brigade. Later he commanded the training base of the brigade, was deputy commander of the brigade and commander of the reservist paratrooper 551 brigade.

Commander of the Paratroopers Brigade 

In 2001, he was appointed commander of the Paratroopers Brigade, a position he held until 2003. Together with a group of other commanders from the field units, including Moshe Tamir, Yair Golan, Gal Hirsch and Noam Tibon, he was one of the pushers to act against the sources of Palestinian militancy during the Second Intifada in the kasbahs and refugee camps, despite being crowded and complicated urban areas, and despite the hesitations of the IDF senior command. He successfully led the brigade in a takeover of the Balata refugee camp in Nablus in February 2002.

He then led the brigade in Operation Defensive Shield, and in other operations throughout the West Bank against Palestinian militant infrastructure, among them, the conquest of Bethlehem and the imposition of a siege on the Church of the Nativity, in which fifty armed wanted men fortified themselves, held about 200 hostages and waged gun battles against the IDF.

In 2002 during the Second Intifada while on the battlefield, Kochavi developed the use of a 5 kg hammer to break down walls and cross through homes in refugee camps to prevent his soldiers from being shot by snipers. This tactic has been copied by other armies, including the United States military.

Brigadier general roles 
In 2003, he was promoted to the rank of brigadier general and appointed commander of the 98th Paratroopers Division, and served until November 2004. On November 30, 2004, he was appointed commander of the Gaza Division, and led the division in operations against Qassam rocket launches and Palestinian militants infrastructure in the Gaza Strip, including Operation Summer Rains. During his service as division commander, two significant events occurred: the disengagement plan in September 2005 and the abduction of Gilad Shalit in June 2006.

In 2007, he was appointed head of the Operations Division of the IDF's Operations Directorate, a position he held until January 2010, during which time he participated in the planning of Operation Cast Lead. After that, he served as a project manager in the Planning Directorate.

Major general roles 
He received the role of the chief of the Israeli Military Intelligence Directorate on November 22, 2010. During his tenure, he took part in the planning of Operation Pillar of Defense, Operation Full Disclosure, Operation Brother's Keeper and Operation Protective Edge.

In November 2014 he was appointed as the commander of the Northern Command. During his tenure, the barrier against Hezbollah on the border with Lebanon was built, at the same time the command forces conducted activities to thwart militant infrastructure from Syrian territory, along with promoting a good neighborhood project called Operation Good Neighbor on the Syrian border.

On May 11, 2017, he was appointed as Deputy Chief of the General Staff of the Israel Defense Forces. He served in this position until December 13, 2018.

Chief of the General Staff 
On October 26, 2018, Defense Minister Avigdor Lieberman recommended his appointment as the 22nd IDF Chief of Staff, with the consent of Prime Minister Benjamin Netanyahu. On November 25, the government approved his appointment. On January 15, 2019, he was promoted to the rank of Lieutenant General and began his service as Chief of Staff.

In November 2019 Kochavi commanded the IDF in Operation Black Belt, when it fought against the Palestinian Islamic Jihad (PIJ), following the targeted killing of senior PIJ commander Baha Abu al-Ata in Gaza. He also led Israel's military during Operation Guardian of the Walls in May 2021.

Later in May, Defense Minister Benny Gantz announced that he will request from the government to approve extending his tenure as IDF Chief of Staff by an additional year. In July, the government approved the extension of term. In August 2022, Kochavi led Israeli forces during Operation Breaking Dawn. On January 16, 2023, Kochavi handed over his role to Herzi Halevi and officially finished his active military service.

Personal life
Kochavi is vegetarian, is married and is the father of three daughters. He lives in Adi.

Kochavi's brother is Dr. Zohar Kochavi, Head of Research at Zulat for Equality and Human Rights Institute.

Awards and decorations
Aviv Kochavi was awarded three campaign ribbons for his service during three conflicts.

References

External links
 Israeli army officer cancels UK trip to avoid war charges, The Daily Telegraph
 "Ma'asei Aman": Permanent Change in a Changing Reality
 Aviv Kochavi, To Be a Military Leader, The Dado Center for Interdisciplinary Military Studies, June 22, 2022

1964 births
Living people
Directors of the Military Intelligence Directorate (Israel)
Hebrew University of Jerusalem alumni
Israeli generals
People from Kiryat Bialik
Paul H. Nitze School of Advanced International Studies alumni
Harvard Kennedy School alumni
Jewish military personnel
Israeli people of Polish-Jewish descent
Israeli people of Russian-Jewish descent